Peter de Waal  (born 1938) is an Australian LGBT rights activist and author. He was a foundation member of the Campaign Against Moral Persecution (CAMP) and participated in the first Sydney Gay and Lesbian Mardi Gras.

Biography
Peter De Waal was born in 1938. As lifelong activists for the gay and lesbian community in Sydney, de Waal and his partner Peter Bonsall-Boone shared Australia's first televised gay male kiss, established a counselling service from their Balmain home and confronted police during the first Sydney Mardi Gras parade in 1978.

de Waal is one of the group known as the “78ers” who participated in the events in Sydney in 1978 including the first Sydney Gay and Lesbian Mardi Gras parade, protests at Darlinghurst and Central Police Stations and Central Court, and marches through the city. He attended the New South Wales State Parliament formal bipartisan apology to the 78ers on 25 February 2016.

Works

Awards
In June 2017, de Waal and Bonsall-Boone (posthumously) were both inducted as a Member of the Order of Australia in the 2017 Queen's Birthday Honours, "for significant service to the community as an LGBTIQ advocate and supporter, and through a range of volunteer roles."

See also 
Sue Wills
Jessica Origliasso
Julie McCrossin
Salena Rocky Malone
Bianca Elmir

References

1938 births
Living people
Australian LGBT rights activists
Members of the Order of Australia
People from Sydney
LGBT culture in Sydney
Australian LGBT writers